The Six Days of Cologne was a six-day track cycling race held annually in Cologne, Germany.

Winners

References

Cycle races in Germany
Six-day races
Recurring sporting events established in 1928
Recurring sporting events disestablished in 1998
1928 establishments in Germany
1998 disestablishments in Germany
Defunct cycling races in Germany